Argyresthia aureoargentella is a moth of the family Yponomeutidae. It is found in North America, including Ontario and Quebec.

Adults are whitish. They are on wing from early June to late July. There is one generation per year.

The larvae feed on Thuja occidentalis. They mine the leaves of their host plant. Pupation takes place in a whitish, spindle-shaped cocoon that is located outside the mine on the foliage.

References

Moths described in 1953
Argyresthia
Moths of North America